Subiaco railway station is a railway station on the Transperth network in Western Australia. It is located on the Fremantle line and Airport line,  from Perth station serving the suburbs of Subiaco and Wembley.

History

Subiaco station opened in 1883. The station closed on 1 September 1979 along with the rest of the Fremantle line, re-opening on 29 July 1983 when services were restored. Up until the 1980s there was a freight receiving depot at this station, and a third platform.

As part of the Subi Centro project,  of rail line and the station were sunk in 1997–98. The elevated signal cabin was restored and relocated to Whiteman Village Junction on the Bennett Brook Railway in January 2000.

Until the opening of the William Street platforms at Perth station in October 2007, it was the only underground railway station on the Transperth network.

Services
Subiaco station is served by Transperth Fremantle line services from Fremantle to Perth that continue through to Midland via the Midland line.

Since 10 October 2022, the station has received Airport line services.

Subiaco station saw 975,390 passengers in the 2013–14 financial year.

Platforms

Bus routes

References

Fremantle line
Railway stations in Perth, Western Australia
Railway stations in Australia opened in 1883
Subiaco, Western Australia
Railway stations located underground in Perth, Western Australia
Bus stations in Perth, Western Australia
Airport line, Perth